Batangan may refer to:

One of the South Mangyan languages
Batangas Tagalog